Maurice "Reese" Fleming (born December 6, 1993) is an American football cornerback who is currently a free agent. He played college football at West Virginia, and was signed by the Tampa Bay Buccaneers as an undrafted free agent in 2017.

College career
Fleming was a three-star recruit coming out of high school. He received offers from Wisconsin, Illinois, Indiana, Boston College but decided to enroll to Iowa. He later transferred to West Virginia.

Professional career
Fleming signed with the Tampa Bay Buccaneers as an undrafted free agent on May 1, 2017. He was waived/injured on August 19, 2017, after being injured in a preseason game against the Jacksonville Jaguars and was placed on injured reserve. Five days later, the Buccaneers and Fleming reached an injury settlement, and he was released. He was re-signed to the Buccaneers' practice squad on November 29, 2017. He signed a reserve/future contract with the Buccaneers on January 3, 2018.

On June 15, 2018, Fleming was waived/injured by the Buccaneers and was placed on injured reserve. He was released on December 21, 2018.

References

1993 births
Living people
Players of American football from Chicago
American football cornerbacks
West Virginia Mountaineers football players
Tampa Bay Buccaneers players
Ottawa Redblacks players